Mayer Brown is a global white-shoe law firm, founded in Chicago, Illinois, United States. It has offices in 27 cities across the Americas, Asia, Europe, and the Middle East, with its largest offices being in Chicago, Washington, D.C., New York City, Hong Kong, and London. Mayer Brown has more than 1,800 lawyers and by revenue is the 19th largest law firm in the world.

History 
Mayer Brown was founded in Chicago in the late 1800’s. Among its earliest clients were retail giant Sears Roebuck and Co.

The three firms that now form the core of Mayer Brown were all founded in the 19th century. The US portion of the firm was founded in 1881 in Chicago, by Adolf Kraus and Levy Mayer, and was shortly thereafter known as Kraus, Mayer & Brackett. After several changes in name to reflect its growing membership, the firm eventually became known in the US as Mayer, Brown & Platt.

In 2002, the firm merged with British law firm Rowe & Maw which was established in 1895 in London and operated under that name until joining with Mayer, Brown & Platt in 2002 to form Mayer, Brown, Rowe & Maw. In 2007, the amalgamated firm shortened its name to Mayer Brown.

Johnson Stokes & Master was formed in 1863 in Hong Kong, and is today known as Mayer Brown (formerly Mayer Brown JSM) after merging with Mayer Brown in 2008.

Mayer Brown has offices in Asia, Europe, the Americas and the Middle East. In Brazil, the firm has an association with Tauil & Chequer Advogados. The firm operates as a collective of separate legal entities with offices in 14 countries. In October 2022, the firm launched its own joint law venture with Singapore law firm PK Wong & Nair LLC known as Mayer Brown PK Wong & Nair PTE. Ltd (“Mayer Brown”).  The firms' other Asia offices are in Beijing, Hanoi, Ho Chi Minh City, Shanghai and Tokyo.

As of 2009, the firm represented 89 companies of the Fortune 500.

Pro bono work 
Mayer Brown is a signatory to the Pro Bono Institute's Law Firm Pro Bono Challenge, which commits the firm to devote 3 percent of total billable time to pro bono work and a member of the UK Joint Protocol on Pro Bono Work, which stipulates that pro bono legal work must be carried out to the same standard as chargeable work.

Partner John F. Halbleib represented the Milton Hershey School on a pro bono basis from 1998 to 2002.

In 2001, lawyer Lee Rubin represented the National Security Archives in an effort by the U.S. State Department to recover 10,000 pages of transcripts of telephone conversations from former Secretary of State Henry Kissinger

Ward Johnson, a managing partner in the firm’s Northern California office, secured the release of Ken Oliver who had been convicted in 1997 to life in prison under California’s "three strikes" law. Oliver spent 23 years in prison before Johnson secured his release in 2017 along with along with a $125,000 settlement for violating Oliver’s civil rights.

Attorney Brian Netter spent four years working pro bono to have the District of Columbia’s budget freed from federal control in a case tied to the 2012 Budget Autonomy Act.

Partner Marcia Maack, the director of pro-bono activities for the firm, helped secure a special immigrant visa in 2017 for an interpreter who had served American forces in Iraq.

In 2017 attorney Andrew Pincus represented the city of Seattle in a pro bono lawsuit challenging the Trump administration’s threats against sanctuary cities that refused to aid in federal immigration crackdowns. That same year, Pincus and others represented two Yemeni men who had been detained at the Dulles Airport in Washington, D.C. after Trump signed the first ban on travelers from seven majority Muslim countries.

Partners Nicole Saharsky, Michael Scodro and Marcia Goodman along with associates Minh Nguyen-Dang and Carmen Longoria-Green, obtained a landmark settlement for the players on the US Women’s National Soccer Team (USWNT) in their 2019 equal-pay lawsuit against the US Soccer Federation (USSF). The parties agreed to settle for $24 million in backpay damages and a guarantee of equal pay going forward for all games, including for the World Cup. This is the first commitment from a major US sports federation to pay female and male athletes equally.

In 2019, Mayer Brown obtained a nationwide injunction against the US government and its decision to terminate temporary protected status for 60,000 Haitians.

Attorneys Matthew Ingber, Christopher Mikesh, and Justin Perkins secured asylum in the United States for a 12-year old Nigerian chess prodigy and his family.

Recognitions 
Legal 500 Asia Pacific 2023: ranked in 40 practice categories.
IFLR Asia Pacific Awards 2021: “Financial Services Regulatory Team of the Year” and "High-Yield Deal of the Year" Awards 
Received a perfect score on the Human Rights Campaign Foundation's Corporate Equality Index 2021.
2020 Asia IP Awards: "Hong Kong Copyright Law Firm of the Year"
The Law Society of Hong Kong's 2020 Pro Bono and Community Service Award: "Distinguished Pro Bono Law Firm Award" and "Silver Law Firm Award for Pro Bono" 
Law360 Firm of the Year 2016-2020 and Practices of the Year for: Appellate, Banking, Benefits, Consumer Protection, Environmental, Project Finance, Securitizations, and Tax.
On Law360's "Global 20" 2019 list of law firms doing the most substantial, complex and diverse global work
34 top-tier national and 80 top-tier metropolitan U.S. News Best Law Firms 2019 rankings
Earned the highest overall scores in client service performance among law firms in the 2019 BTI Client Service 30.
Received Private Equity, Projects & Energy and Real Estate deal of the year honors at the China Law & Practice Awards 2018.
Mayer Brown named Top Law Firm for Training Contracts and Vacation Schemes at AllAboutLaw Awards 2018

Notable lawyers and alumni 

 Kenneth D. Bell - judge of the United States District Court for the Western District of North Carolina.
 Richard Ben-Veniste - Watergate prosecutor and member of 9/11 Commission
 Peter Beyer - German politician and member of the Bundestag
 Neil Bluhm - Businessman and casino owner
 Günter Burghardt - Former European Union ambassador to the United States
 William M. Daley - White House Chief of Staff under President Barack Obama
 Rajesh De - Member of 9/11 Commission and general counsel of U.S. National Security Agency
 Julian Dibbell -  American author and technology journalist
 Thomas M. Durkin - Judge of the United States District Court for the Northern District of Illinois.
 Tyrone C. Fahner - Former Illinois Attorney General.
 Gary Feinerman - Former judge of the United States District Court for the Northern District of Illinois.
 Kenneth Geller -  Former Deputy Solicitor General of the United States and former Assistant Special Prosecutor in the Watergate Special Prosecution Force.
 Mark Gitenstein - United States ambassador to the European Union
 Joseph Robert Goeke -  Senior judge of the United States Tax Court.
 Hector Gonzalez - Judge of the United States District Court for the Eastern District of New York.
 Robert Hertzberg - Member of the California State Senate and Speaker of the California Assembly 
 Mickey Kantor - U.S. Secretary of Commerce and U.S. Trade Representative.
 Leo Katz - Professor of Law at the University of Pennsylvania Law School.
 Adolf Krauss - Founding partner in the law firm of Kraus and Mayer
 Lori Lightfoot - Mayor of Chicago
 Levy Mayer - Co-founder of Mayer Brown known for defending large corporations against anti-trust litigation
 David M. McIntosh - Co-founder of The Federalist Society and The Club For Growth
 Friedrich Merz - German lawyer and politician
 Toby Moffett - Former U.S. Congressman from Connecticut
 Richard T. Morrison - Judge of the United States Tax Court.
 Michael Punke - Author and former Deputy United States Trade Representative and U.S. Ambassador to the World Trade Organization
 Carl Risch - Former U.S. Assistant Secretary of State for Consular Affairs
 Andrew H. Schapiro - Former United States Ambassador to the Czech Republic
 John Schmidt -  Former United States Associate Attorney General
 Rebekah Scheinfeld - Commissioner of the Chicago Department of Transportation (CDOT)
 Vijay Shanker -  Judge of the District of Columbia Court of Appeals.
 Nathan Simington - Commissioner of the U.S. Federal Communications Commission (FCC)
 Adlai Stevenson III - U.S. Senator from Illinois 
 John J. Sullivan - Former United States Ambassador to Russia and United States Deputy Secretary of State
 John Tharp - United States district judge

Significant matters 
Mayer Brown represented AT&T before the US Supreme Court in AT&T Mobility v. Concepcion.

In Credit Suisse First Boston Ltd. v. Billing, the firm represented Credit Suisse in a precedent-setting case which determined that banks and mutual funds could not be sued under antitrust law over stock losses.

The firm represented Phillip Morris USA before the US Supreme Court in Philip Morris USA v. Williams which held that a jury may not punish a defendant for injuries suffered by non-parties.

Role in Refco Inc. collapse 
Refco was a New York-based broker of commodities and futures contracts. In 2005, the company filed for bankruptcy after significant evidence of accounting fraud surfaced. In the wake of the collapse, a lawsuit was filed in 2007 against Mayer Brown and one of its partners, Joseph Collins, alleging that the firm knowingly participated in securities fraud. In November 2012, Collins was found guilty on multiple charges of conspiracy and fraud for his role in preparing Refco's IPO. The law firm itself agreed to pay an undisclosed sum to settle the legal claims against it.

Role in the removal of a Tiananmen Square massacre statue 

In October 2021, Mayer Brown was hired by the University of Hong Kong to help remove a statue memorialising the victims of the 1989 Tiananmen Square protests and massacre from its campus. The statue, known as the Pillar of Shame, was on loan from its creator, Danish sculptor Jens Galschiøt had been placed in the campus for more than 20 years.

The law firm issued a letter to Hong Kong Alliance, a pro-democracy organization which had erected the statue, requesting that that sculpture be removed. The request to remove the statue attracted global criticism. Danish foreign minister Jeppe Kofod raised the matter with the Chinese government while United States Senator Pat Toomey criticized the removal attempt as an attempt to "rewrite history".  Galschiøt, the sculpture's creator, compared the law firm's handling to Italian mafia methods and said, "I believe that Mayer Brown is morally and ethically responsible for helping to destroy the only mark of remembrance of the Tiananmen peace plan that exists on Chinese territory."

In response, the university defended its position by saying that the decision was based on “the latest risk assessment and legal advice”. In a statement, Mayer Brown said, "We were asked to provide a specific service on a real estate matter for our long-term client, the University of Hong Kong... Our legal advice is not intended as commentary on current or historical events." This response prompted the press and activists to draw comparisons with the law firm's reaction following the murder of George Floyd. The firm had issued a statement following Floyd's murder in June 2020, that "[a]s members of the legal community, we bear a special and heightened responsibility. We understand that the rule of law requires that everyone, and especially those in power, be held accountable for their actions."

Two days after the removal deadline set by the law firm, and while the sculpture was still in place despite the deadline had already passed, Mayer Brown confirmed that they would stop representing the university regarding the sculpture removal.

References

Further reading

 Alt URL

External links
 Official Chinese web site
 LinkedIn:  Mayer Brown Asia page

 
Law firms with offices in foreign countries
Law firms based in Chicago
Law firms established in 1881
1857 establishments in Illinois
Law firms